"The Whiskey Ain't Workin'" is a song recorded by American country music artists Travis Tritt and Marty Stuart. It was released in November 1991 as the third single from Tritt's album It's All About to Change.  It peaked at number two on the Billboard country music chart in the United States, and at number four on the country singles chart in Canada.  The song was written by Stuart and Ronny Scaife.

The song won both artists the Grammy Award for Best Country Collaboration with Vocals at the 356h Annual Grammy Awards in 1992.

Music video
The music video is directed by Gerry Wenner. In it, Tritt and Stuart are at a bar and they wind up going to jail, but are bailed out by a woman who was also at the bar.

Personnel
Compiled from liner notes.

 Richard Bennett — electric guitar
 Mike Brignardello — bass guitar
 Larry Byrom — acoustic guitar
 Terry Crisp — steel guitar
 Stuart Duncan — fiddle
 Dennis Locorriere — background vocals
 Tim Passmore — background vocals
 Matt Rollings — piano
 Jim Ruggiere — harmonica
 Marty Stuart — electric guitar solo, lead and background vocals
 Travis Tritt — lead vocals
 Steve Turner — drums
 Billy Joe Walker Jr. — electric guitar

Chart positions

Year-end charts

References

Travis Tritt songs
Marty Stuart songs
1992 singles
Male vocal duets
Songs written by Marty Stuart
Warner Records singles
Songs written by Ronny Scaife
1991 songs